Pure II is Maksim Mrvica's fifth international album release. It was released on  26 February 2008.

Track listing
Victory (Tonči Huljić)
Six Bagatelles: Grave (Prestissimo) (Srećko Bradić)
Quasi Burlesca
Presto Brilliante
Presto Ritmico
Largo
Allegro Vivo
Alexander The Great (Tonči Huljić)
Passionata (Tonči Huljić)
Yellow River (Xian Xinghai)
A Play Of Glass Beads (Ivo Josipović)
Poseidon’s Tale (Tonči Huljić)
Budapest Café (Tonči Huljić)
Ballade No.2 In B Minor (Franz Liszt)
Victory (Remix)(Tonči Huljić)

See also
Pure

References

External links
Maksim "Pure II"
Toshiba-EMI Maksim's Japan site

Maksim Mrvica albums
2008 albums